Following is a list of all Article III United States federal judges appointed by President Warren G. Harding during his presidency. In total Harding appointed 52 Article III federal judges, including 4 Justices to the Supreme Court of the United States (including one Chief Justice), 6 judges to the United States Courts of Appeals, and 42 judges to the United States district courts.

Additionally, Harding appointed 4 judges to the United States Court of Customs Appeals, an Article I tribunal.

United States Supreme Court justices

Courts of appeals

District courts

Specialty courts (Article I)

United States Court of Customs Appeals

Notes

Renominations

References
General

 

Specific

Judicial appointments
Harding